Acosmeryx omissa is a moth of the family Sphingidae. It was described by Rothschild and Jordan in 1903. It is known from south-east Asia, including Thailand.

References

Acosmeryx
Moths described in 1903
Moths of Asia